Señorita República Dominicana 1962 was held on January 29, 1962, when 26 candidates competed for the national crown. The winner represented the Dominican Republic at the Miss Universe 1962 . The first runner up would enter Miss International 1962. Only the 25 provinces and 1 municipality entered. The top ten contestants wore evening gowns and answered questions to get through to the top 5, where they answered more questions.

Results

Señorita República Dominicana 1962 : Sarah Olimpia Frómeta Pou) Santo Domingo
1st Runner Up : Milagros García (Santiago Rodríguez)
2nd Runner Up : Caty Zamora (Peravia)
3rd Runner Up : Iris Tavarez (San Juan de la Maguana)
4th Runner Up : Fernánda Gómez (Pedernales)

Top 10

Carina Santana (Santiago)
Clarisa Germán (Jimaní)
Luz del Ara (Valverde)
Gina Rosal (Distrito Nacional)
Mireya Meran (San Rafael)

Special awards

 Miss Rostro Bello - Clarisa Germán (Jimaní)
 Miss Photogenic (voted by press reporters) - Iris Tavarez (San Juan de la Maguana)
 Miss Congeniality (voted by Miss Dominican Republic Universe contestants) - Sarah Frómeta (Santo Domingo, Dominican Republic)

Delegates

 Azua - Lize Germania Oman Garzon
 Baoruco - Mean Fausta Peralta Peralta
 Barahona - Fausta Reina Aroyo Tatis
 Ciudad Santo Domingo - Eliza Desi Abreu Olis
 Dajabón - Teodora Mary Ureña Panis
 Distrito Nacional - Gina Marianela Rosal Duarte
 Duarte - Altagracia Teresita Lara Eros
 Espaillat - Miledis Margarita Reyes Roid
 Jimaní - Clarisa Laura Germán Peralta
 La Altagracia - Margarita Rojas Rosario
 La Vega - Ana Lissette Ferro Ynoa
 Monte Cristi - Carmen Isabel Fermin Garca
 Pedernales - Fernánda Carlixta Gómez Valle
 Peravia - Catherine Alexis Zamora Camu
 Santo Domingo, Dominican Republic - Sarah Olimpia Frómeta de Schad
 Salcedo - María Teresa Solís Colmenares
 Samaná - Julisa de Reina Asturias Indriago
 Sánchez Ramírez - Denise Carmela Alavrez Voyd
 San Cristóbal - Milly Carina Reyes Vegas
 San Juan de la Maguana - Iris Ceneyda Tavarez Matos
 San Pedro - Ynes Daina Vargas Garoid
 San Rafael - Mireya Marelne Meran Martínez
 Santiago - Carina Valentina Santana Cabrera
 Santiago Rodríguez - Milagros del Carmen García Duval
 Séibo - Ana Lucia Lara Tenerife
 Valverde - Luz Clarita del Ara Polanco

Miss Dominican Republic
1962 beauty pageants
1962 in the Dominican Republic